Bono's Restaurant and Deli is a historic restaurant located at 15395 Foothill Boulevard in Fontana, California. The restaurant opened in 1936 to serve travelers on U.S. Route 66, which then passed in front of the site; it originally operated as a produce stand. In 1943, increased traffic on the highway prompted the owners to expand their operations, and the current building was constructed as a full-service restaurant. The restaurant building has a Streamline Moderne design and features red and green stripes promoting its Italian cuisine as well as painted grapevines promoting its wine. As Fontana's Italian immigrant community grew in the 1940s, the restaurant also became a local source of Italian foods previously unavailable in the area.

While the restaurant had an orange-shaped stand of its own when it served Route 66 traffic, it was eventually demolished due to decreased demand. The Big Orange is one of six surviving orange-shaped buildings in California.

The restaurant, which reopened on February 8, 2019, after being closed for many years, was added to the National Register of Historic Places in 2008. Joe Bono received permission to move the building  back from Foothill Boulevard in 2013.

References

Commercial buildings on the National Register of Historic Places in California
Streamline Moderne architecture in California
Commercial buildings completed in 1943
Buildings and structures in San Bernardino County, California
U.S. Route 66 in California
Buildings and structures on U.S. Route 66
National Register of Historic Places in San Bernardino County, California